Lake Windermere (or Windermere Lake) is a very large widening in the Columbia River. The village of Windermere is located on the east side of the lake, and the larger town of Invermere is located on the lake's northwestern corner. The average depth of the lake is only .

Lake Windermere is a popular vacationing spot, especially for residents of Calgary, which is a three-hour car drive to the east. The western side of the lake which fronts the Purcell Mountains has a railroad running along its shore, and as a result, housing and recreational development is minimal there. The eastern side of the lake has a more extensive flatland between the lake and the Rocky Mountains and has experienced considerable development including cottages, camping grounds, recreational beaches, golf courses and various tourist attractions.

Windermere Lake was once known as Lower Columbia Lake, and will be seen as such on older maps of the area. It was given its current name by G.M. Sproat in 1902 because it resembled Lake Windermere in the English Lake District.

Lake Windermere Whiteway
The longest ice skating trail can be found on the Lake Windermere Whiteway. The naturally frozen trail measures .

See also
Windermere Lake Provincial Park

References

Columbia River
Lakes of British Columbia
Columbia Valley
Kootenay Land District